José Francisco Urrejola Menchaca (born 4 March 1881–28 December 2004) was a Chilean politician and lawyer who served as President of the Senate of Chile.

External links
 BCN Profile

1881 births
1946 deaths
People from Concepción, Chile
Chilean people of Basque descent
Conservative Party (Chile) politicians
Deputies of the XXXI Legislative Period of the National Congress of Chile
Deputies of the XXXII Legislative Period of the National Congress of Chile
Deputies of the XXXIII Legislative Period of the National Congress of Chile
Deputies of the XXXV Legislative Period of the National Congress of Chile
Deputies of the XXXVII Legislative Period of the National Congress of Chile
Presidents of the Senate of Chile
University of Chile alumni